The Williams Fork is a tributary of the Colorado River, approximately  long, in north central Colorado in the United States. It flows through Grand County between the valleys of the Fraser River and the Blue River. It flows north-northwest to the Williams Fork Reservoir, then turns northeast and joins the Colorado at Parshall.

See also
List of rivers of Colorado
List of tributaries of the Colorado River

References

Rivers of Grand County, Colorado
Rivers of Colorado
Tributaries of the Colorado River in Colorado